Sam Jensen (born 17 January 1997) is a speedway rider from Denmark.

Speedway career 
Jensen rode for Hosted Tigers in his native Denmark from 2015 until 2021, except 2016, when he was loaned to Holstebro.

In 2017, Jensen became the Danish U21 Champion. In 2019, he signed for Glasgow Tigers for the SGB Championship 2019. He spent a second season with the Scottish club during the SGB Championship 2021 season.

References 

Living people
1997 births
Danish speedway riders
Glasgow Tigers riders